Start Right Here: Remembering the Life of Keith Green is a compilation album by various artists paying tribute to deceased American contemporary Christian music musician Keith Green. It was released in 2000.

Track listing

External links
 Phantom Tollbooth Review
 Jesus Freak Hideout Review
 Amazon.com Page

2001 compilation albums
Keith Green albums